Bermel is a surname. Notable people with the surname include:

Derek Bermel (born 1967), American composer, clarinetist, and conductor
Joseph Bermel (1860–1921), American politician
Peter Bermel (born 1967), German swimmer